Elaeus or Elaios was a town of ancient Aetolia, belonging to Calydon, was strongly fortified, having received all the necessary munitions from king Attalus I. It was taken by Philip V of Macedon in 219 BCE. Its name indicates that it was situated in a marshy district; and it must have been on the coast to have received supplies from Attalus.

References

Populated places in ancient Aetolia
Former populated places in Greece
Lost ancient cities and towns